The fourth season of the American television series Whose Line Is It Anyway? premiered on ABC on September 6, 2001, and concluded on April 11, 2002.

Cast

Recurring 
 Kathy Greenwood (eight episodes)
 Brad Sherwood (eight episodes)
 Greg Proops (six episodes)
 Chip Esten (six episodes)
 Jeff Davis (two episodes)
 Whoopi Goldberg (one episode)

Episodes 

"Winner(s)" of each episode as chosen by hosts Drew Carey are highlighted in italics. The winner would take his or her seat and call a sketch for Drew to perform (often with the help of the rest).

References

External links
Whose Line Is It Anyway? (U.S.) (a Titles & Air Dates Guide)
Mark's guide to Whose Line is it Anyway? - Episode Guide

Whose Line Is It Anyway?
2001 American television seasons
2002 American television seasons